Waterson Corners is a community in Rideau-Goulbourn Ward in Ottawa, Ontario.

Neighbourhoods in Ottawa